Standard car may refer to:

 A mid-size car or full-size car, or a vehicle size class in between those two
 A car with manual transmission
 A car manufactured by the Standard Motor Company